Jia'ao (died 541 BC) was from 544 to 541 BC the king of Chu, a major power during the Spring and Autumn period of ancient China.  Born Xiong Yuan, he succeeded his father King Kang of Chu who died in 545 BC.

Jia'ao's uncle Prince Wei served as his prime minister.  In 541 BC when Jia'ao was ill, Prince Wei murdered him and his two sons Xiong Mu and Xiong Pingxia, and usurped the throne.  Prince Wei was later given the pejorative posthumous title King Ling of Chu.

References

Monarchs of Chu (state)
Chinese kings
6th-century BC Chinese monarchs
541 BC deaths
Year of birth unknown
6th-century BC murdered monarchs
Assassinated Chinese politicians